Love, Life aur Lahore is a Pakistani Soap opera which aired on A-Plus.  Written by Khalil-ur-Rehman Qamar, it has Fiza Ali and Sami Khan in lead roles while Sami was later replaced by Moammar Rana. It became one of the longest-running soap series in the history of Pakistani television, and ran for almost three years until its end in April 2013.

It started reran on Atv in Pakistan while in UAE and India the show was aired by B4U Network on B4U Plus.

Plot 
It is based on the unfulfilled love story of old Waris Ali & his beloved Hindu girl Gaitri, who get apart at the time of the independence of Pakistan in 1947. The heartwarming tale continues after 62 years tunneling through emotions, cultural divide, the human need to love & be loved.

Story move around a man named Pari paiker (Sami Khan) and his childhood love Lubna Hameed (Fiza Ali) and their love story. Pari paiker and Lubna Hameed both have an unmatched Chemistry which causes them frustration till the end and Lubna killed by tuba mangeter in the end for separation of Pari paiker from their mohalla.

Cast
 Sami Khan/Moammar Rana as Pari paiker
 Fiza Ali as Lubna Hameed
 Faizan Khawaja 
 Shamil Khan
 Muamar Rana
 Shafqat Cheema
 Iftikhar Thakur
 Kashif Mehmood
 Nayyar Ejaz 
 Ali Anjum
 Farhana Maqsood
 Yasmeen Haq
 Laiba Khan
 Asma Abbas
 Khalid Butt
 Jiya Ali
 Kamran Mujahid
 Ashraf Ali 
 Muhsin Gillani 
 Shahista Jabeen
 M Naeem Kashmiri
 Moshin Gillani
 Ali Tabish
 Bilal Chaudary
 Dilawer Ahmed
 Zainab Ahmed

Movie adaptation 
The soap serial was also later adapted into a movie Kaaf Kangana in 2019 the script of which was also penned by Khalil-ur-Rehman Qamar. Sami Khan and Fiza Ali respired their roles from the serial while Sami also played the same lead character as in serial.

Accolades

12th Lux Style Awards
 Best TV Actor-Kashif Mehmood-Nominated
 Best TV Actress-Fiza Ali-Nominated

References

External links
 Official website
 Watch the trailer of Love, Life aur Lahore on YouTube

A-Plus TV original programming
Partition of India in fiction
2013 Pakistani television series debuts
2013 Pakistani television series endings
Urdu-language television shows